Franz-Wilhelm Matejka (26 December 1896 – date of death unknown) was an Austrian tennis player.

Matejka, a left-handed player from Vienna, represented Austria in the Davis Cup from 1927 to 1934. In a 1932 tie against Germany he held a match point against Gottfried von Cramm, before falling 6–8 in the fifth set. He had two Davis Cup wins over Roderich Menzel and beat Uberto De Morpurgo in 1933. A six-time national champion, he won the Austrian International Championship in 1934, defeating countryman Georg von Metaxa in the final. He reached the fourth round of the French Championships three times and made it as far as the third round at the Wimbledon Championships.

See also
List of Austria Davis Cup team representatives

References

External links
 
 
 

1896 births
Year of death missing
Austrian male tennis players
Tennis players from Vienna